Russia participated in the 2010 Winter Olympics in Vancouver, British Columbia, Canada.

In summary, the country's participants earned 15 medals: three gold, five silver, and seven bronze. The gold-medal tally of three was the worst ever result for Russia since the breakup of the Soviet Union, whilst the total of 15 medals was the country's second lowest score since the 2002 Winter Games. This was seen as a national humiliation considering that Russia was to host the next Winter Games at Sochi.

According to Dr Maxim Titorenko, a Russian psychoanalyst and anthropologist,"the reasons for failures were to a large extent psychological. By receiving advance rewards [from the government] for something they were expected to do in future, the sportsmen lost all psychological incentive for further achievements.” The comparatively poor result generated a "chorus of criticism" in Russia, and President Dmitry Medvedev demanded the resignation of Russian Olympic officials and ordered an audit. Corruption, as well as cronyism and apathy of Russian sports managers, was criticized. It was later learned that Russia's performance at the Olympics followed widespread misspending by sports officials and a dysfunctional bureaucracy, according to government auditors. Russia spent $186 million for the games, including preparations. The audit cited dozens of examples of money being wasted, saying the figure ran into millions of dollars.

By contrast, Russia performed well at the Paralympics, also hosted in Vancouver, the following month. This led the media to highlight the contrast between the achievements of the country's Olympic and Paralympic delegations, despite the greater attention awarded to the Olympics.

With Sochi being the host city of the 2014 Winter Olympics, a Russian segment was performed at the closing ceremony.

Medalists

Alpine skiing 
.

Biathlon 

Men

Women

Bobsleigh

Cross-country skiing 

Distance
Men

Women

Sprint

Curling

Women's tournament 

Team: 
Skip: Ludmila Privivkova 
Third: Anna Sidorova 
Second: Nkeiruka Ezekh 
Lead: Ekaterina Galkina 
Alternate: Margarita Fomina

Round-robin
Draw 1
Tuesday, 16 February, 2:00 PM

Draw 3
Wednesday, 17 February, 7:00 PM

Draw 4
Thursday, 18 February, 2:00 PM'

Draw 5Friday, 19 February, 9:00 AMDraw 6Friday, 19 February, 7:00 PMDraw 7Saturday, 20 February, 2:00 PMDraw 8Sunday, 21 February, 9:00 AMDraw 10Monday, 22 February, 2:00 PMDraw 12Tuesday, 23 February, 7:00 PM''

Standings

Figure skating 

Russia has qualified two entrants in men's singles, two in ladies singles, three in pair skating, and three in ice dancing, for a total of 16 athletes.

Key: CD = Compulsory Dance, FD = Free Dance, FS = Free Skate, OD = Original Dance, SP = Short Program

Freestyle skiing 

Men

Women

Ski cross

Ice hockey

Men's tournament 

Roster

Group play 
Russia played in Group B.
Round-robin
All times are local (UTC-8).

Standings

Final rounds 
Quarterfinal

Women's tournament 

Roster

Group play 
Russia played in Group B.
Round-robin
All times are local (UTC-8).

Standings

Final rounds 
Fifth place semifinal

Fifth place game

Luge

Nordic combined

Short track speed skating

Skeleton

Ski jumping

Snowboarding 

Parallel GS

Snowboard cross

Speed skating 

Men

Women

Team pursuit

See also
 Russia at the 2010 Winter Paralympics

References

External links 
  - Russian Olympic Team given a blessing at the Cathedral of Christ the Saviour in Moscow

Oly
Nations at the 2010 Winter Olympics
2010